"What's that got to do with the...?" is an expression denoting an irrelevance or non sequitur in the current discussion.
 
A common form, what does that have to do with the price of tea in China?, is a retort to an irrelevant suggestion.  This facetious usage implies that the topic under discussion might as well be the price of tea in China for all the relevance the speaker's suggestion bears on it.

Possible origins 

This expression may have stemmed from economists, who describe everything economic as affecting everything else, trying to find an expression which denotes the farthest logical connection from their current economic focus, in a sort of butterfly effect. In this way, the price of tea in China was used to denote the farthest possibility. It can also be used to denote an irrelevant topic.

Another explanation of the phrase's origin is that in the 19th century the price for tea in England was the highest when the first ship with the newly harvested tea from the tightly controlled Chinese markets came in. So for the ship owners it was important to be as fast as possible back to England with the load, otherwise the cost of the passage might not be recovered from the sale of the tea. Thus there were real races (the tea clipper races) where the sail ships managed to travel the whole distance from China to England in about 80 to 90 days.

The difference in prices from the first load to the later ones was so high that the original price which was paid for the tea in China was quite unimportant. So the "price of tea in China" was something that really didn't matter for the ship owners. They had to have the tea in England as fast as possible.

Related expressions 
A related expression in Hebrew can be found in a commentary on the Biblical commandment of the septennial Shmitah or sabbatical year. Leviticus 25:1 specifically states that God spoke to Moses on Mount Sinai; while this was a common location for God to speak to Moses, the text's explicit reference to it is very rare. Accordingly, Rashi's commentary begins with the question "What does Shmita have to do with Mount Sinai?" (?מה עניין שמיטה אצל הר סיני) The question in rabbinic culture took on a general meaning equivalent to that of the "price of tea in China" expression.

There is also a similar phrase in Polish which says: "What does a piernik have to do with a windmill?" ("Co ma piernik do wiatraka?"). The exact origin of the expression is uncertain. Another similar phrase also exists in French, "Quel est le rapport avec la choucroute ?", which translates to "What does it have to do with the sauerkraut?"

References 

English phrases